Serial is an investigative journalism podcast hosted by Sarah Koenig, narrating a nonfiction story over multiple episodes. The series was co-created and is co-produced by Koenig and Julie Snyder and developed by This American Life; as of July 2020, it is owned by The New York Times. 

Season 1 investigated the 1999 killing of Hae Min Lee (Hangul: 이해민), an 18-year-old student at Woodlawn High School in Baltimore County. Season 2 focused on Sergeant Bowe Bergdahl, an American Army soldier who was held for five years by the Taliban, and then charged with desertion. Season 3, which debuted in September 2018, explores cases within the Justice Center Complex in the Cleveland area. 

Serial ranked number one on iTunes even before its debut and remained there for several weeks. Serial won a Peabody Award in April 2015 for its innovative telling of a long-form nonfiction story. As of September 2018, episodes of seasons 1 and 2 have been downloaded over 340 million times, establishing an ongoing podcast world record.

Series overview 

Koenig has said that Serial is "about the basics: love and death and justice and truth. All these big, big things." She also has noted, "this is not an original idea. Maybe in podcast form it is, and trying to do it as a documentary story is really, really hard. But trying to do it as a serial, this is as old as Dickens."

New York Magazine reported that Phil Lord and Chris Miller, directors of The Lego Movie and the film 21 Jump Street, would be producing a television program about the podcast that will take a "behind-the-scenes approach that details how Koenig went from virtual anonymity to creating one of 2014's biggest cultural phenomenons".

Season 1 (2014)
On February 9, 2015, Scott Pelley of CBS News reported Serials season 1 episodes had been downloaded more than 68 million times. By February 2016, the episodes had been downloaded over 80 million times.

Season 1 investigated the 1999 Killing of Hae Min Lee, an 18-year-old student at Woodlawn High School in Baltimore. She was last seen at about 3 p.m. on January 13, 1999. Her corpse was discovered on February 9 in Leakin Park and identified two days later.  

The case was immediately treated as a homicide. On February 12, an anonymous source contacted authorities and suggested that Adnan Masud Syed, Lee's ex-boyfriend, might be a suspect. Syed was arrested on February 28 at 6 a.m. and charged with first-degree murder, which led to "some closure and some peace" for Lee's family. A memorial service for Lee was held on March 11 at Woodlawn High School. 

Syed's first trial ended in a mistrial, but, after a six-week second trial, Syed was found guilty of Lee's murder on February 25, 2000, and was given a life sentence. On September 19, 2022, a judge, citing the prosecution's failure to hand over potentially beneficial evidence to the defense, overturned the conviction. Syed, after 23 years in prison, went free.

People involved
 Hae Min Lee – 18-year-old high school student and athlete, abducted in January 1999 and found dead the next month
 Adnan Syed – former boyfriend of Lee who was convicted of killing her in 2000. His conviction was vacated in 2022 – nearly eight years after the podcast was published – after prosecutors filed a motion stating that "the state no longer has confidence in the integrity of the conviction.”
 Jay Wilds – key witness at Syed's trial and professed accomplice of Syed
 Stephanie McPherson – Jay's girlfriend and close friend and classmate of Syed
 Don Clinedinst – Lee's boyfriend at the time of her murder and colleague at Lenscrafters, an eyewear shop
 Aisha Pittman – classmate and Lee's close friend
 Jennifer (Jenn) Pusateri – Jay's close friend
 Debbie Warren – Lee's friend who said Lee told her she was meeting Don after school
 Krista Myers – classmate and close friend of Lee and Syed, who recalled Syed asked Lee for a ride after school the day she disappeared
 Becky Walker – classmate/friend who remembered Lee and Syed had talked about a ride, who also said she saw Syed after school
 "Cathy" – a friend of Pusateri who said she saw Wilds and Syed on the day Lee disappeared
 Saad Chaudry – Syed's best friend
 Asia McClain – student at Woodlawn High School and acquaintance of Syed and Lee, said she saw Syed in the library at the time of the murder
 Laura Estrada – classmate who did not believe Syed was guilty, but who did not think Jay would lie about something serious
 Nisha – student from Silver Spring, Md. and friend of Syed's, who was called from Syed's phone at 3:32 pm, a time during which Syed claimed Jay (who did not know Nisha) had his phone
 Yasser Ali – Syed's friend from the mosque
 Rabia Chaudry – friend of Syed's family, older sister of Saad Chaudry, and an attorney, who has been fighting for years to prove Adnan's innocence
 "Mr. S" – discovered Lee's body in Leakin Park
 Kevin Urick and Kathleen "KC" Murphy – state prosecutors at trial
 M. Cristina Gutierrez – Syed's defense attorney
 Detectives Bill Ritz and Greg MacGillivary – lead homicide investigators

Season 2 (2015–16)
In September 2015, The New York Times reported the second season would focus on Sergeant Bowe Bergdahl, an American Army soldier who was held for five years by the Taliban, and then charged with desertion. A spokesperson for Serial only said, "Over the last few months they've been reporting on a variety of stories for both seasons 2 and 3 of Serial, along with other podcast projects." The first episode of the season was released, without any previous release date announcement, on December 10, 2015.

For season 2, Koenig teamed up with Mark Boal, the Academy Award–winning screenwriter of The Hurt Locker and Zero Dark Thirty, and his production company, Page 1. Boal had conducted a series of interviews with Bergdahl as part of a film production he was working on, and both Boal and Bergdahl gave Koenig permission to use those excerpts of those recorded interviews in episodes of Serial. As Koenig stated in season 2's first episode: "They'd come to us saying 'hey, we've been doing all this reporting on the story, and we've also got this tape. Do you think you might want to listen?' And yes, we did, and we were kind of blown away, and so we began working with them. They shared their research with us, and also put us in touch with many of their sources... We don't have anything to do with their movie, but Mark and Page 1 are our partners for Season 2."

On December 14, 2015, General Robert B. Abrams, head of United States Army Forces Command at Fort Bragg, North Carolina ordered that Bergdahl face a court-martial on charges of desertion.

Sarah Koenig announced on January 12, 2016, that the podcast schedule would be changed to every other week to allow for deeper reporting, and to add more information than initially planned. Internet radio service Pandora Radio streamed the second season of Serial.

On November 3, 2017, military judge Col. Jeffery R. Nance rendered a verdict dishonorably discharging Bergdahl from the Army, reducing his rank to private and requiring forfeit of some of his pay for ten months  and no prison time. The verdict is subject to review by Gen. Robert B. Abrams, and may also be appealed to the United States Army Court of Criminal Appeals. After the sentencing, Serial announced its team to be working on a "coda" for the season.

Award 
In June 2017, the Radio Television Digital News Association announced season 2 of Serial won the 2017 National Edward R. Murrow Award for a news series and for its website. Murrow Awards are presented in October in New York.

Persons involved
 Sergeant Bowe Bergdahl – held for five years by the Taliban, then released in May 2014 in exchange for Taliban prisoners held in the Guantanamo Bay detention camp. He was court-martialed on charges of desertion and misbehavior before the enemy in December 2015. 
Lieutenant John Billings – Bergdahl's platoon leader
Mark Boal – screenwriter of The Hurt Locker with whom Bergdahl held most of his interviews
Shane Cross – a friend from the same platoon as Bergdahl
Ben Evans – soldier who had described OP Mest, where Bergdahl operated out of
Darrel Hanson – in the same company as Bergdahl
Kayla Harrison – a friend, and Kim Harrison's daughter
Kim Harrison – a friend  Bergdahl identified as his emergency contact
Josh Korder – in the same company as Bergdahl, recorded message for Bergdahl over radio
Austin Landford – soldier whom Bergdahl was supposed to relieve at the end of his shift. It was Landford's noticing Bergdahl's non-presence that notifies the Army that he has gone missing
Mark McCrorie – in the same company as Bergdahl
Mujahet Raman (not his real name) – Taliban who speaks about Bergdahl's capture
Jon Thurman – in the same company as Bergdahl

Season 3 (2018)
Season 3 is meant to be an analysis of the normal operation of the American criminal justice system, as opposed to the previous two seasons, which followed "extraordinary" cases. K. Austin Collins of Vanity Fair commented that the third season was "an overarching account of an institution: the criminal-justice system, writ large". Koenig has described season 3 as "a year watching ordinary criminal justice, in the least exceptional, most middle-of-the-road, most middle-of-the-country place we could find: Cleveland." Episodes follow different cases and are taped in Greater Cleveland, with particular focus on cases before the Cuyahoga County Court of Common Pleas at the Justice Center Complex in Downtown Cleveland.

Episodes

Season 1 (2014)

Season 2 (2015–16)

Season 3 (2018)

Development and release
The concept for Serial originated with an experiment in Koenig's basement. Koenig and Snyder had pitched a different idea at a staff meeting for a weekly program on events during the previous seven days, which staff members received without enthusiasm. When Ira Glass asked Koenig if she had any other ideas, she mentioned podcasting a story that unfolded over time, a serialized narrative. In an interview with Mother Jones, she explained that each episode would return to the same story, telling the next chapter of a long, true narrative.

Episode one of the series was released on October 3, 2014, with additional episodes released weekly online. Glass introduced it as a spinoff of his popular radio program, This American Life, and aired episode one on his show. He explained, "We want to give you the same experience you get from a great HBO or Netflix series, where you get caught up with the characters and the thing unfolds week after week, but with a true story, and no pictures. Like House of Cards, but you can enjoy it while you're driving."

Music
Nicholas Thorburn released the soundtrack for Serial on October 17, 2014. It includes 15 tracks, all short instrumentals, and is available at the Bandcamp site or streamed from several reviewing sites.

Mark Henry Phillips, who mixes the show, has also provided original scores.

Musical credits for Season 2 include Thorburn and Phillips, as well as Fritz Myers and staff music editor Kate Bilinski.

Funding
Serials launch was sponsored by Mailchimp, a frequent podcast advertiser, and salaried staff positions were initially funded by WBEZ. Admitting the podcast was funded from This American Lifes budget during the launch, producer Koenig noted that Serial would eventually need to generate its own funding. She said, "Everyone's saying 'It's podcasting! It's internet! Of course there'll be money somewhere.' We're not exactly sure yet." Dana Chivvis, another producer, observed that, since the industry is still in its infancy, a business model for podcasting has yet to be established.

Towards the end of the first season, producers asked for public donations to fund a second season. Within a week, the staff of Serial posted an announcement that a second season has been made possible by donations and sponsorship.

In July 2020 Serial Productions (the company behind the Serial podcast) was acquired by The New York Times. Techcrunch reported that the deal was valued at $25 million and noted that Sarah Koenig and Julie Snyder would become Times employees as a result of the sale.

Reception

Season 1 (2014)
The first season of Serial was both culturally popular and critically well received.  Serial was ranked at No. 1 on iTunes even before it débuted, leading iTunes rankings for over three months, well after the first season ended. It also broke records as the fastest podcast ever to reach 5 million downloads at Apple's iTunes store.  David Carr in The New York Times called Serial "Podcasting's first breakout hit."  The Guardian characterized it as a "new genre of audio storytelling".

Introducing a PBS NewsHour segment about Serial, Judy Woodruff noted that it is "an unexpected phenomenon",  and Hari Sreenivasan mentioned it has "five million downloads on iTunes, far more than any other podcast in history".

Calling the characters "rich and intriguing", The Daily Californian noted similarities to the film The Thin Blue Line (1988), and described the podcast as "gripping" and the story as "thrilling", while applauding the series for giving "listeners a unique opportunity to humanize the players".

Slates reviewer pointed out that Serial is not escapist and went on to note: "Someone in the show is not telling the truth about something very sinister. That's the narrative tension that makes Serial not only compelling but also unlike anything I can remember watching or reading before." The Baltimore Sun commented on the inherently riveting subject matter and noted that the top-notch reporting and podcast format yield "a novel twist on the investigative long-form piece".

A critique from the journalism community was more qualified. First noting that some people believe there is a "podcast renaissance", the reviewer from Harvard's Nieman Journalism Lab observed that even though podcasts are not new, they are not yet mainstream.

Not all critiques of the podcasting format have been as equivocal. PopMatters observed that podcasting is a new distribution model, very different from television as a distribution model because it gives users access to media and the freedom to listen to episodes of a long-form story while doing other things. The reviewer applauded the focus on long-form journalism and added, "Suddenly you feel like the full promise of podcasting has just been unleashed. That long-form narrative nonfiction is really the way to best leverage the potential of podcasting as a distribution model."

Multiple reviews have commented on the addictive nature of Serial. A review in New York Magazine linked fans' feelings about the possibility of an ambiguous ending with their psychological need for closure. Reddit hosts a Serial subreddit site. Slate is also "following the story closely" and presents a podcast discussion of Serial every week following the latest release.

Several reviews have criticized the ethics of Serial, notably the decision to start broadcasting without the reporting having been finished. Critics said the "live investigation" format invited listeners to do their own sleuthing, which quickly led to exposure online of the full names and even addresses of people who were questioned by the police. Another point of debate was whether it was legitimate to use the murder of Hae Min Lee as a subject for entertainment.

Sarah Koenig's reporting has also been criticized as being biased in favor of Adnan's innocence, and Katy Waldman's Slate blog noted that some felt Serial undercut Adnan's detractors. An Atlantic roundtable discussion noted that the podcast forces the listener to consider Koenig's "verification bias", the tendency to seek answers that support her own biased assumptions, and that "even a well-meaning narrator isn't always credible".

One critic asserted that Koenig presented the story of a murder involving two minority teenagers and their cultures through a lens of white privilege, "a white interpreter 'stomping through communities that she does not understand' ". A rejoinder in The Atlantic pointed out, "Serial is a reflection on a murder case and the criminal-justice system reported over 'just' a year, which is to say, it is researched with more effort and depth than 99 percent of journalism produced on any beat in America... Most of all, the response to mistakes should never be to discourage white reporters from telling important stories."

Serial was honored with a Peabody award in April 2015, noting "Serial rocketed podcasting into the cultural mainstream", and that it was an "experiment in long-form, non-fiction audio storytelling". It was cited for "its innovations of form and its compelling, drilling account of how guilt, truth, and reality are decided". Dr. Jeffrey P. Jones, Director of the Peabody Awards, commented the podcast showed "how new avenues and approaches to storytelling can have a major impact on how we understand truth, reality, and events".

In an interview with Jon Ronson for The Guardian, Syed's mother Shamim and younger brother Yusuf both said they listened to the podcast and that people sent transcripts to Syed in prison. Yusuf said the podcast had indirectly reconnected the family to his estranged brother Tanveer for the first time in the 15 years since the murder.

Three "update" mini-episodes of Serial were posted during Syed's post-conviction hearing in February 2016, coinciding with the run of Season Two. They received limited attention from critics, although Slate's review notably described them as "ragged, chaotic entries [which] can't help but hit us as shadows of what was." 

An HBO docuseries based on the Serial podcast entitled The Case Against Adnan Syed was released in March 2019.

Season 2 (2015–16)
The much-anticipated second season of Serial was released in December 2015. The subject of Season 2 was met with widespread skepticism. Vastly different from the popular murder-mystery story that Season 1 investigated, Season 2's focus on the story behind the U.S. soldier Bowe Bergdahl, who disappeared from his post in Afghanistan in 2009 before being captured by the Taliban and subsequently released in 2014, was contentious due in part to the controversial views of the soldier's departure from his post and also because of the high-profile court martial proceeding for his alleged desertion.

The Guardian summarized the season by saying Koenig and her team managed to add to the conversation: "Not only did they let Bergdahl speak for himself, via a series of interviews with the film-maker Mark Boal, but they also asked and answered a question that no one – including the military or the US government – had seemingly bothered to investigate."
Season 2 of Serial was less about solving a mystery and more about long-term investigative reporting and storytelling. Zach Baron of GQ Magazine reported that he liked the season overall and thought it gave an invaluable document of what it is like to serve in modern wars, but said it was also "something of a cultural disappointment, at least compared to last season."

Similar to Season 1's critical response, some felt that the lack of answers was "infuriating."

Switching to a bi-weekly schedule mid-season caused some to believe the series was losing momentum. However, in an interview with Entertainment Weekly, Sarah Koenig and executive producer Julie Snyder said the download numbers for Season 2 were 50 million, higher than the numbers were by the time Season 1 ended.

Season 3 (2018)
Season 3 received mostly positive reviews. Andrew Liptak at The Verge called it a "return to form". Nicholas Quah at Vulture called it "ambitious, addictive, and completely different".

Season 3 was tied for the 2019 Media for a Just Society Award in radio by the NCCD.

Related podcasts 
The popularity of Serial and the intrigue of the case it covered has spawned several companion podcasts, such as Crime Writers on Serial, The Serial Serial, and Undisclosed: The State vs. Adnan Syed, the latter produced by Rabia Chaudry. S-Town, a 2017 collaboration between the teams of This American Life and Serial, was released to mixed reviews. Also, Nice White Parents and The Improvement Association were yet other related podcast.

Parodies 
Parodies of Serial have targeted the show's  style, its fans' obsessive tendencies, Koenig's curiosity and uncertainties, the charts and graphics posted on the show's website, and the podcast's sponsor MailChimp (especially the meme "MailKimp").

The New Yorker ran a cartoon based on Serial. 
When Koenig appeared on The Colbert Report, Colbert noted that the finale of Serial would be released in competition with Colbert's last episode.
Saturday Night Live spoofed Serial with a sketch investigating Kris Kringle, who for years has allegedly been leaving presents in people's homes.
As part of the promotion for the video game Halo 5: Guardians, developer 343 Industries put out a multi-part, in-universe podcast called Hunt the Truth, investigating the history of the series protagonist, the Master Chief, John-117. Narrated by comedian Keegan-Michael Key as fictional reporter Benjamin Giraud, it is delivered in the style of the Serial podcast, including the narration delivery style of Sarah Koenig and audio style of her in-person and over-the-phone interviews.
Funny or Die released a short video starring Michaela Watkins as a frantic Koenig—unsure of how she will end the series—recording the final episode of Serial. The video mimics Serial'''s style, including asides to the audience demarcated by the Serial theme music. The "Mail Kimp" and "Crab Crib" memes are referenced in the popular video, which had over 880,000 views as of October 2015, placing it in the website's "Immortal: Best of the Best" video category.
In the summer of 2015, Under the Gun Theater developed an improvised show format entitled One Story Told Week by Week which satirized Serial. According to Chicago Tribune writer, Nina Metz, the host parodied Koenig's "distinctively intimate and inquisitive vocal delivery," as well as  contained moments that satirized the podcast's "attempt at amateur sleuthing."
Sarah Koenig made a cameo appearance in an episode of the animated comedy series BoJack Horseman as a ringtone, parodying her introduction to episodes of the podcast.
In November and December 2016, Secrets, Crimes and Audiotape was a radio drama anthology podcast series by Wondery that had a five-episode story arc in the form of a musical satire of Serial's Season One, called Wait, Wait, Don't Kill Me. In this so-called "first-ever serialized podcast musical", young struggling reporter Sarah Koenig is possibly involved in Hae Min Lee's murder and her covering the story boosts her career and leads to her cooperation with Ira Glass. The story among other things also makes extended use of the MailKimp meme.
The 2017 Netflix series American Vandal is a mockumentary that parodies the true crime genre in general, and Serial specifically; the characters in American Vandal even acknowledge the similarities to Serial in the fourth episode of the show.
Scream and Trial & Error both featured a podcast host visiting a small town in the aftermath of a murder.
In 2018, The Onion began the parody podcast A Very Fatal Murder, which aimed to satirize the true crime genre of podcasts.
In the 2021 Hulu series Only Murders in the Building, the main characters listen to a true crime podcast called All is Not Okay in Oklahoma, a parody of Serial'' with Tina Fey playing the Sarah Koenig equivalent, Cinda Canning.

See also
List of American crime podcasts

References

External links 

 
 

Investigative journalism
Infotainment
Audio podcasts
Peabody Award-winning radio programs
2014 podcast debuts
Crime podcasts
Shorty Award winners
Podcasts adapted into television shows
American podcasts